László Simon (July 16, 1948 – September 9, 2009) was a Hungarian pianist.

Professional life
László Simon was born in Miskolc. He studied under Zoltán Benkö in Budapest, and under Hans Leygraf in Stockholm and Hannover. He also received artistic and pianistic incitements from Claudio Arrau in New York. He would later be praised for his excellent performance in international piano competitions Casagrande (1971, 1st place, jointly shared), Geneva and Busoni and received the King's Swedish Music Award. His recording of the twelfth Transcendental Études by Franz Liszt was later part of the evidence in the plagiarism scandal involving recordings by the English pianist Joyce Hatto (1928-2006), and became more famous as a result of the investigation.

László Simon was a respected piano teacher throughout the world. After working in Darmstadt, Hannover and Karlsruhe, he became a professor at the Berlin University of the Arts in 1981.  In this position, he mentored the conductress Shi-yeon Sung as well as the pianists Gergely Boganyi, Li-Chun Su and Ji-yeoun You. He died in Berlin, aged 63.

Press coverage

D.A.W.M.: Remarkable Liszt. In: The Daily Telegraph (1975)

D.A.W.M.: László Simon. In: The Daily Telegraph (Feb. 1977)

Dominic Gill: Laszlo Simon. In: London Financial Times (1977)

References

External links

 CD Collection László Simon IN MEMORIAM
 Recordings of Laszlo Simon from BIS
 Article about the plagiarism of Joyce Hatto

1948 births
2009 deaths
Hungarian classical pianists
Male classical pianists
20th-century classical pianists
20th-century Hungarian male musicians
People from Miskolc